Chhagalnaiya is an upazila of Feni District in the Division of Chittagong, Bangladesh.

Chhagalnaiya lies in the southern part of the district, bordering Tripura and Mirsharai Upazila of Chittagong. It is rich in history and culture. The great medieval warrior Shamsher Gazi hailed from Chhagalnaiya. It is also the birthplace of many other noted historical figures including Sir A. F. Rahman, first Muslim Vice Chancellor of Dhaka University, journalist Abdus Salam (Editor), Gaziul Haque, Advocate Kazi Fazlul Haque and Riaz Rahman (former Foreign Secretary). Hafej al aref (R) is forefather of Nizpanua Khondaker family. Al-Haj Nur Ahmed Mozumder, Former Upazila Chairman son of famous businessman Haji Baduzzaman Mozumder.

Geography and history
It has 26564 household units and a total area of 133.49 km2.

Chagalnaiya is an Upazila in the Feni district in Bangladesh. It is believed that the name of the area changed from Sagarnaiya (whom the sea bathes or bathes) to Chagalnaiya 'as a result of mistakenly writing L instead of R in official documents during the British rule. Due to its convenient geographical location and proximity to the border, the place has historically played an important role - especially during the liberation war of Bangladesh.
Goats have nothing to do with this region, on the other hand, it is a region created by the freezing of the sea char and Naiya means sailor, it means Sagarnaiya is a sea sailor, this is the logical reason. It is now believed that Chhagalnaiya is actually a derivative of Sagarnaiya or 'sea-sailor' as many people from this region used to go to the sea to earn their bread as fishermen in large sampan boats.

Demographics

As of the 1991 Bangladesh census, Chhagalnaiya has a population of 154116. Males constitute 49.79% of the population, and females 50.21%. This Upazila's 18+ population is 73541. Chhagalnaiya has an average literacy rate of 43.9% (7+ years), whereas the national average is 32.4%.

Administration
Chhagalnaiya Upazila is divided into Chhagalnaiya Municipality and five union parishads: Gopal, Mohamaya, Pathannagar, Radhanagar, and Shubhapur. The union parishads are subdivided into 54 mauzas and 58 villages.

Chhagalnaiya Municipality is subdivided into 9 wards and 11 mahallas.

Notable people
Abdus Salam, journalist and editor

See also
 Upazilas of Bangladesh
 Districts of Bangladesh

References

Upazilas of Feni District